Bayannur or Bayannao'er (Bayannaɣur qota, Mongolian Cyrillic Баяннуур хот) is a prefecture-level city in western Inner Mongolia, People's Republic of China. Until 1 December 2003, the area was called Bayannur League.

The name of the city in Mongolian means "Rich Lake". As of the 2010 census, the population of Bayannur was 1,669,915; while the city proper, Linhe District, had 520,300 inhabitants.

The city is served by the Bayannur Tianjitai Airport.

History
The Zhao dynasty (403 BCE–222 BCE) controlled an area including modern-day Bayannur, while the Western Han dynasty (206 BCE–24 CE) established a hierarchical Chinese administrative structure. The Qing dynasty (1644–1912) designated this area as part of "Inner Mongolia", but after its overthrow by the Republic of China (1912–1949), Bayannur was assigned to Suiyuan Province. Because of Mongol-Chinese cooperation with the Communist faction in the Chinese Civil War (stalled since 1950), Suiyuan was annexed to the new Inner Mongolia Autonomous Region from 1954, although not without controversy because of the province's large and longstanding ethnic Han majority.

Geography and climate
Bayannur is located in the western part of inner Mongolia Autonomous region. Neighbouring prefectures are:
Baotou (E)
Alxa (W)
Ordos (S)
It also borders Mongolia to the north. Bayannur features a desert climate (Köppen BWk), marked by long, cold and very dry winters, very warm, somewhat humid summers, and strong winds, especially in spring. Most of the rain falls between July and September, with very little snow in winter.

Demographics
In 2000, there were 1,682,662 inhabitants:

At the end of 2004, the population was at around 1,79 million inhabitants.

Administrative subdivisions
Bayannur is divided into one district, two counties and four banners:

Cuisine
Located in Hetao Plain, Bayannaoer is the largest agricultural hub in Inner Mongolia. Bayannaoer is famous for "Bameng braised dishes", meaning "braised dishes".

References

External links
 Official website

Cities in Inner Mongolia
Prefecture-level divisions of Inner Mongolia